Communications Voir is a Canadian newspaper company, which publishes several alternative weekly newspapers, predominantly in the province of Quebec.

The company has published six French weeklies, all based in Quebec, and two English weeklies, one based in Quebec and one in Ontario. The company discontinued several of its titles, including both of the English publications, in 2012.

Publications
French
 Gatineau - Voir Gatineau/Ottawa
 Montreal - Voir Montréal
 Quebec City - Voir Québec
 Saguenay - Voir Saguenay/Alma - Ceased publication on May 3, 2012
 Sherbrooke - Voir Estrie
 Trois-Rivières - Voir Mauricie - Ceased publication on May 3, 2012

English
 Montreal - Hour Community - Ceased publication on May 3, 2012
 Ottawa - xPress - Ceased publication on May 17, 2012

Newspaper companies of Canada
Companies based in Montreal